The Emilia-Romagna regional election of 2014 took place on 23 November 2014.

The three-term incumbent President of the Region, Vasco Errani of the centre-left Democratic Party resigned in July 2014 after the conviction for fraudulent misrepresentation, triggering a snap election.

In an election marked by the lowest turnout ever in the Region (37.7%), Stefano Bonaccini, a Democrat, was elected President by defeating several candidates, mainly Alan Fabbri of the Northern League (29.9%) and Giulia Gibertoni of the Five Star Movement (13.3%).

Electoral system
In Emilia-Romagna, a new electoral law was approved by the Legislative Assembly in July 2014, abolishing the blocked list. The first elections regulated by this law were the regional elections of 2014.

The voter can express one or two preference votes for the candidates on the chosen list; in the case of the expression of two preferences, these must concern candidates of different sex according to "gender preference" (under penalty of annulment of the second preference). As regards the election of the councilors, the law guarantees in any case at least 27 seats on the lists that support the elected president (majority prize), obtaining effects that are very similar to those of the list but acting on the provincial lists. The first 40 seats are distributed on a proportional basis. A seat is then attributed to the candidate for president who came second. The remaining 9 seats are assigned by majority method to the lists that support the elected president if these lists have obtained less than 25 seats with the previous procedure, otherwise the "prize" will be only 4 seats. If, at the end of these assignments, the majority lists have not obtained at least 27 seats, these will be guaranteed by removing some of the seats already assigned to the opposition lists.

Parties and leaders

Results

References

2014 elections in Italy
2014 regional election
2014
November 2014 events in Italy